Tunbridge Wells power station supplied electricity to the town of Royal Tunbridge Wells and the surrounding area from 1895 to 1968. The power station was built by the Tunbridge Wells Corporation which operated it until the nationalisation of the British electricity supply industry in 1948.

History 
The Corporation applied in 1891 for a Provisional Order under the Electric Lighting Acts  to generate and supply electricity to the town of Tunbridge Wells. An Order was granted by the Board of Trade and was confirmed by Parliament through the Electric Lighting Orders Confirmation (No. 5) Act 1891 (54 & 55 Vict. c. lxi).

The power station in Quarry Road/ Medway Road was commissioned on 7 August 1895. The site was adjacent to the railway for delivery of coal. The Company charged 6d. and 3d./kWh and sold 258,641 kWh in 1898.

Further plant was added to meet growing demand for electricity. Over the period 1924–1928 the plant was renewed, giving a total generating capacity of 11.25 MW.

The Central Electricity Board built the first stages of the National Grid between 1927 and 1933. Tunbridge Wells power station were connected to the 132 kV electricity grid.

The British electricity supply industry was nationalised in 1948 under the provisions of the Electricity Act 1947 (10 & 11 Geo. 6 c. 54). Tunbridge Wells electricity undertaking was abolished, ownership of Tunbridge Wells power station were vested in the British Electricity Authority, and subsequently the Central Electricity Authority and the Central Electricity Generating Board (CEGB). At the same time the electricity distribution and sales responsibilities of the Tunbridge Wells electricity undertaking were transferred to the South Eastern Electricity Board (SEEBOARD).

Following nationalisation Tunbridge Wells power station became part of the Tunbridge Wells electricity supply district.

Tunbridge Wells power station was closed in 1968.

Equipment specification

Plant in 1898 
The electricity plant in 1898 comprised Willans and Ferranti engines coupled directly to Goolden and Ferranti dynamos, with a total capacity of 304 kW.

Plant in 1923 
By 1923 the plant at Tunbridge Wells comprised boilers delivering a total of 43,000 lb/h (5.42 kg/s) of steam to:

 1 × 300 kW turbo-alternator generating alternating current (AC)
 1 × 400 kW reciprocating engine generating AC
 1 × 500 kW turbo-alternator generating AC
 1 × 1,000 kW turbo-alternator generating AC

The total generating capacity was 2,200 kW.

The following electricity supplies were available to consumers:

 220 Volts 1-phase 67.5 Hz Alternating Current.

Plant in 1954 
By 1954 the plant (originally installed in 1924–28) comprised:

 Boilers:
 3 × Clayton and Shuttleworth boilers each of 22,500 lb/h (2.83 kg/s) capacity
 2 × Babcock and Wilcox boilers each of 26,400 lb/hr (3.33 kg/s) capacity

The total evaporative capacity was 120,300 lb/h (15.16 kg/s), steam conditions were 250 psi and 666 & 680 °F (17.2 bar and 352/360 °C), steam was supplied to:

 Generators:
 2 × 3.75 MW Brush-Ljungstrom turbo-alternators, 3-phase, 50 Hz, 6,600 volts
 2 × 1.875 MW Brush-Ljungstrom turbo-alternators, 3-phase, 50 Hz, 6,600 volts

The total installed generating capacity was 11.25 MW.

Condenser water was cooled in three wooden cooling towers of capacity 0.62 million gallons per hour (0.783 m3/s).

Operations

Operating data 1921–23 
The electricity supply data for the period 1921–23 was:

Electricity Loads on the system were:

Revenue from the sale of current (in 1923) was £34,334; the surplus of revenue over expenses was £18,139.

Operating data 1946 
In 1946 Tunbridge Wells power station supplied 7,502 MWh of electricity; the maximum output load was 9,100 kW.

Operating data 1954–68 
Operating data for the period 1954–68 was:

Tunbridge Wells Electricity District 
Following nationalisation in 1948 Tunbridge Wells power station became part of the Tunbridge Wells electricity supply district, covering 202 square miles (523 km2). The number of consumers and electricity sold in the Tunbridge Wells district was:

In 1958 the number of units sold to categories of consumers was:

Redevelopment 
The power station in Stanley Road (51°08’24”N 0°16’09”E) was demolished, to the east of the site a 132 kV electricity sub-station is still operational.

In Commercial Road the boiler house, coaling facilities and sidings have been cleared but the engine house remains.

See also 

 Timeline of the UK electricity supply industry
 List of power stations in England

References 

Demolished power stations in the United Kingdom
Coal-fired power stations in England
Former power stations in England
Buildings and structures in the Borough of Tunbridge Wells
Royal Tunbridge Wells